The hydroxymethyl group is the name for a substituent with the structural formula −CH2−OH. It consists of a methylene bridge (−CH2− unit) bonded to a hydroxyl group (−OH). This makes the hydroxymethyl group an alcohol. It has the identical chemical formula with the methoxy group (−O−CH3) that differs only in the attachment site and orientation to the rest of the molecule. However, their chemical properties are different.

Hydroxymethyl is the side chain of encoded amino acid serine.

References

External links 

 
Functional groups